Joseph William Dellastatious (born October 2, 1922) is a former American football player and coach. He served as the head football coach at Southwest Missouri State—now known as Missouri State University–from 1953 to 1954, compiling  a record of 5–12. He played college football at the University of Missouri, where he was a quarterback. He had previously played at Clemson University.

Dellastatious was drafted by National Football League (NFL) teams twice, first by the Pittsburgh Steelers in the 1945 NFL Draft and by the Detroit Lions in the first round of the 1946 NFL Draft.

Dellastatious was predeceased by his wife, Anne Lee, who died in Jackson, Tennessee on May 13, 2017, at the age of 87. He turned 100 in 2022.

Head coaching record

Football

References

1922 births
Living people
American football quarterbacks
Clemson Tigers football players
Florida Gators football coaches
Florida Gators men's golf coaches
Missouri Tigers football players
Missouri State Bears football coaches
American centenarians
Men centenarians